Justice is a 2019 South Korean television series starring Choi Jin-hyuk, Son Hyun-joo, Nana, and Park Sung-hoon. It is based on the web novel Justice, written by Jang Ho and illustrated by Elja. The series aired on KBS2's Wednesdays and Thursdays at 22:00 (KST) time slot from July 17 to September 5, 2019.

Synopsis
Lee Tae-kyeong is a lawyer who often helps CEO Song Woo-yong's richest clients.

Cast

Main
 Choi Jin-hyuk as Lee Tae-kyung (34 years old)
One of the industry's most successful lawyers.
 Son Hyun-joo as Song Woo-yong (53 years old)
Chung-Hyung Construction's President.
 Nana as Seo Yeon-ah (30 years old)
A competitive prosecutor. Tae-kyung's former girlfriend.
 Park Sung-hoon as Tak Soo-ho (33 years old)
Jung Jin Group's Vice Chairman.

Supporting

People around Yeon-ah
 Lee Hak-ju as Ma Dong-hyuk (31 years old)
A Homicide Detective at Gangnam Police Station.
 Lee Ho-jae as Seo Dong-seok (62 years old)
Yeon-ah's father. Former Attorney General.

Seoul Central District Prosecutor's Office
 Kim Ji-hyun as Cha Nam-sik (45 years old)
Chief Inspector.
 Oh Man-seok as Joo Man-yong (50 years old)
 Assistant Prosecutor General.
 Lee Seo-hwan as Gook Jin-tae (45 years old)
Chief Inspection Officer.
Lee Bom-so-ri Park Hyo-Rim (23 years old)
An assistant.

People around Tae-kyung
 Jo Dal-hwan as Nam Won-gi (42 years old)
Tae-kyung's assistant.
 Kim Hyun-mok as Lee Tae-joo (22 years old at the time of death)
Tae-kyung's younger brother.

Jang Entertainment Company
 Ji Hye-won as Jang Yeong-mi (24 years old)
A rookie actress.
 Lee Seo-an as Jeong Hae-jin (27 years old)
A rookie actress.
 Yang Hyun-min as Jang Chi-soo (39 years old)
Jang Entertainment's President.
 Kim Min-seok as Lee Dong-il (27 years old)
A succulent manager.

People around Son Woo-yong
 Kim Hee-chan as Song Dae-jin (28 years old)
Song Woo-young's son.
 Jang In-sub as Section chief Choi (34 years old)
Song Woo-yong's right hand.
Lee Gang-Wook as Jo Hyun-Woo (29 years old)
The driver who caused Tae-joo to die in a traffic accident.

Others
Lee Dae-yeon as Detective Kang (59 years old)
A Homicide Detective at Gangnam Police Station
 Kim Ju-mi as Shim Seon-hee (21 years old)
 Victim of methanol case.
 Song Duk-ho as Shim Kwang-hee (25 years old)
Shim Seon-hee's brother.
Heo Dong-Won as Yang Chul-Ki (59 years old)
Man with 7 criminal charges.
Lee Hwang-Eui as Do Hoon-Je (55 years old)
Currently the head of the National Tax Service and the next Minister of Land, Transport and Tourism.
Han Ki-Joong as Shin Il-Hoon
Chairman of the Ilshin Ilbo, the most influential Korean media company.
Park Han-sol as Yeon-hyo
Lee Eol as Public Prosecutor General.

Production
 Early working title of the series is Inner Circle (Korean: 이너 서클).
 The first script reading was held in April 2019 at KBS Annex Broadcasting Station in Yeouido, South Korea.

Viewership

Notes

References

External links
  
 
 
 

Korean Broadcasting System television dramas
Korean-language television shows
2019 South Korean television series debuts
2019 South Korean television series endings
South Korean legal television series